Gianluigi Di Franco (5 January 1953, in Capri – 19 March 2005, in Naples) was an Italian singer. In the early 1970s he joined the brothers Corrado and Danilo Rustici and formed the progressive rock band Cervello. The group disbanded after one album and Di Franco spent the 1970s working in a psychiatric hospital in Naples as a musicotherapist In the early 1980s Di Franco resumed his music career. He collaborated with percussionist Tony Esposito, singing lead vocals on "Kalimba de luna" (1984) and "As Tu As" (1985). He also worked with Tullio De Piscopo and Mory Kanté on the single "Radio Africa" (1986). In 1988 he released his first solo album, Gianluigi Di Franco.

Discography
With Cervello: Melos (1973)

Solo album
Gianluigi Di Franco  (Dischi Ricordi  SMRL 6377) 1988
Siren Ligheia
Go heavy
Luna
Semiramide
Nighi Naga
Insh'Allah
Scirocco
Can we be wrong
Vurria addiventare
Jingle in the jungle
Una vela nell’azzurro

References

1953 births
2005 deaths
20th-century Italian  male singers
Musicians from Naples